Sangaris albida is a species of beetle in the family Cerambycidae. It was described by Monné in 1993. It is known from Brazil.

References

albida
Beetles described in 1993